Kastornaya is a rural locality in Mokovsky Selsoviet Rural Settlement, Kursky District, Kursk Oblast, Russia. Population:

Geography 
The village is located 83.5 km from the Russia–Ukraine border, 9 km west of Kursk, at the western border of the selsoviet center – 1st Mokva.

 Streets
There are the following streets in the locality: Dachnaya, Medovaya, Pokrovskaya, Sirenevaya, Spasskaya and Zemlyanichnaya (128 houses).

 Climate
Kastornaya has a warm-summer humid continental climate (Dfb in the Köppen climate classification).

Transport 
Kastornaya is located 2.5 km from the federal route  Crimea Highway (a part of the European route ), 10 km from the nearest railway station Ryshkovo (railway line Lgov I — Kursk).

The rural locality is situated 17 km from Kursk Vostochny Airport, 124 km from Belgorod International Airport and 220 km from Voronezh Peter the Great Airport.

References

Notes

Sources

Rural localities in Kursky District, Kursk Oblast